The Kinh Môn River is a river of Vietnam. It flows through Hải Dương Province and Hai Phong for 45 kilometres.

References

Rivers of Hải Dương province
Rivers of Haiphong
Rivers of Vietnam